Jitendra Narayan Dev  is a Nepali politician belonging to Nepali Congress. He is also member of Rastriya Sabha and was elected under open category. A prominent leader from Madhesh province, Dev has served as minister several times.

He was elected central committee member of Nepali Congress elected from the 14th general convention of Nepali Congress.

References 

People from Saptari District
Nepali Congress politicians from Madhesh Province
Living people
Year of birth missing (living people)
Members of the National Assembly (Nepal)